Ad. Dili Leste or Associação Desportiva Dili Leste is a football club of East Timor from Dili. The team plays in the Taça Digicel.

External links
 Ad. Dili Leste at National-Football-Teams.com

Football clubs in East Timor
 
2010 establishments in East Timor
Sport in Dili